The Chihuahua chub (Gila nigrescens) is a species of ray-finned fish in the family Cyprinidae. It is found in Chihuahua, Mexico and in New Mexico, United States. The males can reach 24 cm (9.5 in) in length.

References

Chubs (fish)
Gila (fish)
Freshwater fish of Mexico
Freshwater fish of the United States
Fish of the Western United States
Chihuahua chub
Chihuahua chub
Taxa named by Charles Frédéric Girard
Fish described in 1856
Taxonomy articles created by Polbot
ESA threatened species